Harry H. Gilbert  (July 7, 1868 – December 23, 1909) was a Major League Baseball second baseman. He played in two games for the  Pittsburgh Alleghenys of the National League on June 23, 1890. He started both ends of a doubleheader against the Philadelphia Phillies, collecting eight at bats with two hits. His brother, John Gilbert was his teammate with the Alleghenys.  The Pittsburgh Alleghenies became the Pittsburgh Pirates.

Sources

Major League Baseball second basemen
Pittsburgh Alleghenys players
Baseball players from Pennsylvania
1868 births
1909 deaths
19th-century baseball players